Thalassophryninae is a subfamily of toadfish in the family Batrachoididae. The species in the subfamily are characterised by the possession of two dorsal fin spines, a lack of subopercular spines, with the dorsal and opercular spines being hollow and have venom glands at their base. They do not have canine teeth.

Genera
There are two genera in the Thalassophryninae:

 Daector Jordan & Evermann, 1898
 Thalassophryne Günther, 1861

References

Batrachoididae